
This is a list of the 43 players who earned 1996 PGA Tour cards through the PGA Tour Qualifying Tournament in 1995.

 PGA Tour rookie in 1996

1996 Results

*PGA Tour rookie in 1996
T = Tied
 The player retained his PGA Tour card for 1997 (finished inside the top 125)
 The player did not retain his PGA Tour card for 1997, but retained conditional status (finished between 126-150)
 The player did not retain his PGA Tour card for 1997 (finished outside the top 150)

Winners on the PGA Tour in 1996

Runners-up on the PGA Tour in 1996

See also
1995 Nike Tour graduates

References

PGA Tour Qualifying School
PGA Tour Qualifying School Graduates
PGA Tour Qualifying School Graduates